Nicole "Nikki" Addimando (born 1988) is an American woman who shot and killed her domestic partner in Poughkeepsie, New York in September 2017. Originally sentenced to 19 years to life, Addimando's term of imprisonment was reduced on appeal to 7.5 years. She is incarcerated at Bedford Hills Correctional Facility for Women.

Addimando said that her partner, Christopher Grover, had physically and sexually abused her for years, and she provided photographs and other materials she said documented this abuse. She further claimed that she shot Grover while he sat on their couch after he had threatened her with the gun. Grover's family disputed Addimando's abuse claims, and prosecutors argued that Grover had been shot while he was asleep.  Addimando was ultimately convicted of second-degree murder and second-degree criminal possession of a handgun.

Background 

The couple met in 2008, when Nicole was 19 and Christopher 21, at a gym where they were both employed as gymnastics teachers. In 2012, after Nicole became pregnant, they moved in together in Salt Point, New York. In 2013, Christopher began to force Nicole to have sex with him, and if she refused, he would attack her violently. A second child was born in February 2015, and Christopher continued to violently abuse Nicole. He also filmed the abuse and uploaded the videos to PornHub without her consent. In November 2015, Family Services contacted Jason Ruscillo, a detective from Hyde Park. In preparation for the meeting, Sarah Caprioli of Family Services prepared an affidavit describing the abuse Addimando had told Caprioli about, but Addimando did not sign it.

In September 2017, Addimando told a police officer that she tried to run away from Grover, but he threatened to kill her. There had been a fight, and Addimando shot and killed Grover.

Sentence Reduction
In 2019, New York passed a law—the Domestic Violence Survivors Justice Act—that authorized reductions in sentences for domestic-violence survivors when the abuse they suffered "was a significant contributing factor to the defendant's criminal behavior." Judge Edward McLoughlin originally ruled that Addimando's case did not meet the requirements of a reduced sentence because, according to the judge, she could have left her abuser. An appeals court disagreed and reduced Addimando's sentence to 7.5 years.

Clemency Effort
In November 2021, Addimando filed a clemency application, attaching a petition in support of application with 30,000 signatures. A separate petition supporting Addimando's clemency push amassed 579,000 signatures.

References 

Incidents of domestic violence
American people convicted of murder
American female murderers
Living people
September 2017 crimes in the United States
2017 crimes in New York (state)
1988 births
Mariticides